Bonaventura van Overbeek (1660–1705) was a Dutch Golden Age draughtsman and engraver.

Biography

Overbeek was born and died in Amsterdam.  According to Houbraken, he drew the Roman ruins from life and, while in Rome, he joined the Bentvueghels with the nickname Romulus. He published several etchings of his drawings, but also published a book with descriptions of the major sites of Rome in 1708, that he had dedicated to the English princess Anna – he died before publication and the book was published by his nephew Michiel van Overbeke. Bonaventura was born a year too late for Houbraken's third volume on artists, and perhaps it was Houbraken's notes that Jan van Gool used for his 7-page biographical sketch of him.

According to the RKD his cousin Michiel van Overbeke published his prints after his death (Amsterdam 1708). He is known for italianate landscapes and was a pupil of Gerard de Lairesse. He travelled to Rome and drew the antiquities, and after he returned was welcomed back by De Lairesse, who took him in. He started to collect plaster casts and drawings, with a view to writing a book on art history.

References

Bonaventura van Overbeek on Artnet
Overbeek's Les restes de l'ancienne Rome on Facultés Universitaires Notre-Dame de la Paix (university of Wallonie-Bruxelles) website

1660 births
1705 deaths
Dutch Golden Age printmakers
Artists from Amsterdam
Members of the Bentvueghels